Rimbaud is a surname. Notable people with the surname include:

 Arthur Rimbaud (1854–1891), French poet
 Penny Rimbaud (born 1943), British writer, poet, philosopher, painter, musician, and activist
 Robin Rimbaud or Scanner (born 1964), British electronic musician

See also

Raimbaud
Raimbaut
Reinebold
Reinbold
Regenbald
Regimbald